Uummannaq Airport may refer to:

Uummannaq Heliport, in Uummannaq, Greenland
Qaarsut Airport, also known as Uummannaq/Qaarsut Airport that serves Uummannaq and Qaarsut, Greenland